Physics, Math, and Astronomy Building (abbreviated PMA; formerly known as Robert Lee Moore Hall or RLM) is a high rise building on the University of Texas at Austin campus, in the U.S. state of Texas. The building was completed in 1972, and houses the astronomy, mathematics, and physics departments, as well as the Kuehne Physics Mathematics Astronomy Library.

The building was originally named after mathematician Robert Lee Moore. In 2016, students demanded the building be renamed because of Moore's racist treatment of African American students. On , during the George Floyd protests, University Interim President Jay Hartzell announced that the building would be renamed as the Physics, Math and Astronomy Building.

References

External links

 

1972 establishments in Texas
University and college buildings completed in 1972
University of Texas at Austin campus
Name changes due to the George Floyd protests